Happy Days in Aranjuez is a 1933 German comedy film directed by Johannes Meyer and starring Brigitte Helm, Gustaf Gründgens and Wolfgang Liebeneiner. The film focus on a notorious jewel thief operating in high society. The title refers to Aranjuez in Spain.

The film was made by UFA, Germany's largest production company. It was shot at the Babelsberg Studios in Berlin with sets designed by art directors Erich Kettelhut and Max Mellin. It was based on a play of the same name by Hans Székely and Robert A. Stemmle. A separate French-language version  with Brigitte Helm and Jean Gabin was made. In 1936 the film was remade in Hollywood as Desire, a vehicle for Marlene Dietrich.

Cast
 Brigitte Helm as Olga
 Gustaf Gründgens as Alexander
 Wolfgang Liebeneiner as Pierre
 Kurt Vespermann as Fred
 Jakob Tiedtke as Juwelier Dergan
 Max Gülstorff as Professor Ronnay
 Ernst Dumcke as Kommissar Léron
 Rudolf Biebrach as Der alte Gaston
 Elfriede Jera as Marietta
 Hans Deppe
 Fritz Greiner
 Harry Hardt
 Paul Henckels
 Leo Peukert

References

Bibliography

External links 
 

1933 films
German comedy films
1933 comedy films
1930s German-language films
Films directed by Johannes Meyer
UFA GmbH films
Films set in Spain
Films of the Weimar Republic
German multilingual films
German black-and-white films
Aranjuez
1933 multilingual films
Films shot at Babelsberg Studios
1930s German films